Pseudmelisa rubrosignata is a moth in the family Erebidae. It was described by Sergius G. Kiriakoff in 1957. It is found in Malawi and Tanzania.

References

Moths described in 1957
Syntomini